Diogo Miguel Morgado Soares (born 17 January 1981), is a Portuguese actor who may be best known for his portrayal of Jesus in the History Channel epic mini-series The Bible and in the film Son of God.

Career

Already a household name in his native Portugal and one of GQs "Men of the Year", Morgado's career spans top television, film and stage productions, including a lead role in the No. 1 rated Portuguese television series and International Emmy winner Laços de Sangue. Morgado began his career at the age of fifteen when he joined the cast of top rated television series Terra Mãe (1998), Diário de Maria (1998), followed by A Lenda da Garça (2000) and A Febre do Ouro Negro (2000). His performance as Miguel in the 2000 telefilm Amo-Te, Teresa earned Morgado high regard as one of the most promising actors of his generation and the TV movie is still one of the highest rated ever in Portugal. Morgado has worked consistently in Portuguese television with over 15 series regular roles, many with the distinguished SIC network. Morgado's film credits include a noteworthy performance in the title role of Portuguese dictator António De Oliveira Salazar in the hit feature film A Vida Privada De Salazar. Morgado was also able to showcase his comedic chops in O Crime do Padre Amaro, which received international attention from directors all over the world. Morgado is also a passionate theater actor and had lead roles in prestigious plays such as David Hare's Skylight and Peter Shaffer's The Royal Hunt to the Sun.

Beyond Portugal, Morgado has had lead roles in a few international films like Spain's Dos Rivales Casi Iguales and Star Crossed, and Brazil's Revelação and The Jungle. Morgado has also wrapped leading roles in two independent films in the U.S. – the gritty urban drama Red Butterfly and the action-filled adrenaline film Born to Race: Fast Track. Morgado was recently seen on Portuguese television as Eduardo in the SIC series Sol de Inverno. He also starred in the recent Portuguese comedy film, Virados do Avesso, which debuted at the top of the Portuguese box office.

Diogo Morgado also gave voice to the children's book app, Kiwaka Story, published by Landka, and to the portuguese adaptation of several video games, including Detroit: Become Human and Infamous Second Son. More recently, Morgado begun writing and directing films: his short film, Excuse, was awarded 'Best Short Drama' in the 2018 Silicon Beach Film Festival and he was distinguished by his short film Signal in the L.A. Independent Shorts Awards.

Morgado is perhaps best known in the United States for his portrayal of Jesus in 20th Century Fox's feature film Son of God (for which he received an Imagen Award nomination) and in History Channel's Emmy nominated miniseries, The Bible, which was the highest-rated cable program of 2013. He also appeared on the hit ABC drama Revenge as Dr. Jorge Velez. In 2015, Morgado starred as "The Man" (aka The Devil) in the CW's drama series, The Messengers.

Personal life

Morgado was born in Campo Grande, Lisbon, Portugal.

Morgado currently lives in Portugal.

Has two sons: Santiago (born 2009) and Afonso (born 2016).

In addition to his native Portuguese, Morgado is also fluent in French, Spanish and English.

Filmography

Television
 1997 – Terra Mãe – Miguel
 1999 – A Lenda da Garça – Manuel Domingos
 2000 – Ajuste de Contas – Francisco
 2002/2003 – Tudo Por Amor – Pedro Castelo Branco
 2005 – Os Malucos nas Arábias
 2006 – Floribela – Dinis Mendonça
 2007 – Vingança – Santiago Medina
 2008 – Rebelde Way – Mauro Galvão
 2008 – Podia Acabar o Mundo – Rodrigo Fortunato Louro
 2008 – Revelação – Antônio
 2009 – Novos Malucos do Riso
 2010 – Lua Vermelha – Artur
 2010 – Laços de Sangue – João Caldas Ribeiro
 2013/2014 – Sol de Inverno – Eduardo Aragão
 2017 – Ouro Verde – José-Maria Magalhães / Jorge Monforte

Miniseries and series
 1997 – A Mulher do Senhor Ministro – Modelo
 1998 – Diário de Maria – Luís
 1999 – Jornalistas – Bruno
 1999 – A Hora da Liberdade – Teixeira
 1999 – Médico de Família – Decorador
 2000 – A Febre do Ouro Negro – Bob
 2001 – Estação da Minha Vida
 2001 – Teorema de Pitágoras
 2002 – O Quinto dos Infernos – D. Pedro Carlos de Bourbon
 2004 – O Prédio do Vasco – Doctor
 2004/2005 – Inspector Max – Rui Leão / Miguel
 2004/2005 – Maré Alta – Ship Passenger
 2005 – Malucos e Filhos
 2005 – Malucos na Praia
 2005 – O Diário de Sofia
 2006 – 7 vidas – Adamo
 2006/2008 – Aqui Não Há Quem Viva – Fernando
 2007 – Uma Aventura – Jaime
 2008 – Malucos no Hospital 
 2009 – A Vida Privada de Salazar – António Oliveira Salazar
 2010 – Tempo Final – Pedro
 2011 – Os Substitutos – voz de Dick Daring (Dubbing)
 2013 – The Bible – Jesus
 2014 – Revenge – Dr. Jorge Velez
 2015  –  Alisa – A Heroína do Futuro – voz de Arik Sapojkov (Dubbing)
 2015  –  The Messengers – The Man
 2015/2016 – CSI: Cyber – Miguel Vega
 2018  –  MacGyver – Carlos

Films
 2000 – Amo-te Teresa – Miguel (telefilm)
 2000 – A Noiva – Eduardo (telefilm)
 2001 – Teorema de Pitágoras – Raul
 2003 – A Selva – Alberto
 2003 – Lisboa Regressa ao Parque
 2004 – Vá Para Fora... Ou Vai Dentro!
 2005 – O Crime do Padre Amaro – Libaninho
 2007 – The Italian Writer – Joseph
 2007 – Dos rivales casi iguales – Vicente
 2007 – Acredita, Estou Possuído! – Jorge
 2009 – Star Crossed - Amor em Jogo – Hugo Pereira
 2009 – Mamy Blue – Pancho
 2012 – Maria Coroada – Basílio (telefilm)
 2012 – A Teia de Gelo – Jorge
 2014 – Red Butterfly – Antonio Vega Jr.
 2014 – Fast Lane – Enzo Lauricello
 2014 – Son of God – Jesus
 2014 – Virados do Avesso – João Salgado
 2014 – Women of the Bible – Jesus
 2016 – Love Finds You in Valentine – Derek Sterling
 2017 – Malapata – Barbosa
 2017 – O Matador – Cabeleira
 2018 – Parque Mayer – Eduardo
 2021 - The Unholy - Monsignor Delgarde

Programs
 2000 – Lux – presenter
 2001 – Mundo Vip – presenter
 2004 – Dá-lhe Gás – presenter

References

External links

 

20th-century Portuguese male actors
21st-century Portuguese male actors
Living people
People from Campo Grande
Male actors from Lisbon
Portuguese male film actors
Portuguese male television actors
Portuguese Roman Catholics
1981 births